At the 1908 Summer Olympics in London, nine wrestling events were contested, all for men.  There were four weight classes in Greco-Roman wrestling and five weight classes in freestyle wrestling.

Greco-Roman reappeared for the first time since the 1896 Summer Olympics, with weight classes for the first time.  The number of classes in freestyle was reduced from 7 to 5, with the light fly, fly, and welterweight classes dropped but the middleweight added.  The addition of the 4 Greco-Roman classes brought the total number of events in wrestling up to 9.

Medal summary

Freestyle

Greco-Roman

Participating nations
115 wrestlers from 14 nations competed.

Medal table

Belgium, Bohemia, Germany, and the Netherlands also sent wrestlers, but did not win any medals.

See also
List of World and Olympic Champions in men's freestyle wrestling
List of World and Olympic Champions in Greco-Roman wrestling

References

Sources
 
 

 
1908 Summer Olympics events
1908
Wrestling
1908 in sport wrestling